André Zwoboda (1910–1994) was a French screenwriter, producer and film director.

Selected filmography

Director
 Life Belongs to Us (1936)
Farandole (1945)
 François Villon (1945)
 The Seventh Door (1947)
 Desert Wedding (1948)
 Captain Ardant (1951)

Producer
 Black Girl (1966)

References

Bibliography
 Rège, Philippe. Encyclopedia of French Film Directors, Volume 1. Scarecrow Press, 2009.

External links

1910 births
1994 deaths
French male screenwriters
20th-century French screenwriters
Film directors from Paris
20th-century French male writers